Stade de la Source is a football stadium in Orléans, France. It is the current home of US Orléans. The stadium is able to hold 7,533 people and was opened in 1976.

References

Source
US Orléans
Buildings and structures in Orléans
Sports venues completed in 1976
Sports venues in Loiret
1976 establishments in France